Mac a' Ghobhainn is a Scottish Gaelic surname, meaning "son of the smith". The surname is used as a Scottish Gaelic form of several English-language surnames: MacGowan, and McGowan; Smith; and in Glasgow and Moray, the surnames MacGavin and McGavin. The feminine form of Mac a' Ghobhainn is Nic a' Ghobhainn.

People with the surname
Iain Mac a' Ghobhainn - (1928–1998) - Scottish - writer, known in English as Iain Crichton Smith.

References

Scottish Gaelic-language surnames
Patronymic surnames